This contains a list of banks in Norway. There are three types of banks in Norway: commercial banks, savings banks (Norwegian: Sparebank) and branches of foreign banks.

Commercial banks

Savings banks

Foreign branches

External links
 The Financial Supervisory Authority of Norway
 Registry of Financial Institutions

 
Norway
Banks
Norway